Alicianella quadrimaculata is a species of beetle in the family Cerambycidae, the only species in the genus Alicianella.

References

Elaphidiini